Coal River Locks, Dams, and Log Booms Archeological District is a national historic district and historic archaeological site located on the Coal River in Boone, Lincoln, and Kanawha County, West Virginia. It consists of an underwater resource depicting the navigation and transportation system used on the Coal River during the late-19th and early-20th century.  It includes remains of timber cribs, locks and dams, and a lock master house.  It was designed by William Rosecrans in the mid-1850s, and was one of the first complete lock and dam systems in West Virginia.

It was listed on the National Register of Historic Places in 1997.

References

Archaeological sites on the National Register of Historic Places in West Virginia
Buildings and structures in Kanawha County, West Virginia
Dams on the National Register of Historic Places in West Virginia
Historic districts in Kanawha County, West Virginia
National Register of Historic Places in Kanawha County, West Virginia
Locks on the National Register of Historic Places in West Virginia
Historic districts on the National Register of Historic Places in West Virginia